Arkaul (Arqawıl) is a rural locality (a village) in Ufa, Bashkortostan, Russia. The population was 85 as of 2010. There is 1 street.

Geography 
Arkaul is located 33 km northeast of Ufa. Starye Turbasly is the nearest rural locality.

References 

Rural localities in Ufa urban okrug